Danny Ben-Israel (1944 – 11 March 2019) was an Israeli musician of the late 1960s and early 1970s, producing psychedelic progressive rock with socially concerned lyrics in Hebrew.

Early life
Ben-Israel was born in Tel Aviv in 1944 and started his musical career while still in the Israeli Defence Forces' Northern Command, alongside future pop stars Gadi Yagil and Koby Oshrat. He had a series of pop hits while still in the army.

Career
After leaving the army, he wrote and recorded for films and appeared in several musicals. He toured Europe in 1968 and settled briefly in Austria to record the LP Happy Birthday, Rock'n'Roll. He returned to Tel Aviv in early 1969. He hooked up with guitarist Shlomo Mizrahi, leader of power trio Ha'Bama Ha'Hashmalit and recorded 1970's Bullshit 3, one of the first Israeli psychedelic recordings. The album was harshly criticized by the local media and had little commercial success, but has gained a great reputation amongst collectors, being regarded as a "psychedelic masterpiece".

Other notable albums include The Kathmandu Sessions, recorded soon after Bullshit 3 for a label that went bankrupt and finally issued decades later.

Death
Ben-Israel died on 11 March 2019, at the age of 75.

Select discography
 Happy Birthday, Rock'n'Roll
 Bullshit 3, World In Sound RFR 016LP
 The Kathmandu Sessions, Locust LOCUST 047CD
 The Collection

References

Musicians from Tel Aviv 
20th-century Israeli male musicians
21st-century Israeli male musicians
Date of birth missing
1944 births
2019 deaths
Locust Music artists